Lindsay Meyer (born September 23, 1988) is an American rower. She was born in Seattle, Washington. She competed at the 2008 Summer Olympics in Beijing, where she placed fifth in quadruple sculls, together with Lia Pernell, Jennifer Kaido and Margot Shumway.

References

External links

1988 births
Living people
American female rowers
Olympic rowers of the United States
Rowers at the 2008 Summer Olympics
Rowers from Seattle
Rowers at the 2015 Pan American Games
Pan American Games silver medalists for the United States
Pan American Games medalists in rowing
Medalists at the 2015 Pan American Games
21st-century American women